"Give Me Your Heart Tonight" is a song by Welsh singer Shakin' Stevens, released in August 1982 as the third single from his album of the same name. It peaked at number 11 on the UK Singles Chart. With the release of the album, a promo single was also released, which included four songs from the album.

Track listings 
7": Epic / A 2656 (UK)

 "Give Me Your Heart Tonight" – 3:05
 "Thinkin' of You" – 2:27

7": Epic / XPS 158 (UK, promo)

 "Give Me Your Heart Tonight"
 "Boppity Bop"
 "Oh Julie"
 "Don't Tell Me That We're Through"

Charts

References 

1982 singles
1982 songs
Shakin' Stevens songs
Epic Records singles
Songs written by Billy Livsey